Hamziyeh  is a Syrian village located in Salqin Nahiyah in Harem District, Idlib.  According to the Syria Central Bureau of Statistics (CBS), Hamziyeh had a population of 953 in the 2004 census.

References 

Populated places in Harem District